Stewart Gordon may refer to:

 Stewart L. Gordon (born 1930), American musician and academic
 Stewart N. Gordon (born 1945), American historian and writer

See also
Stuart Gordon (disambiguation)
Gordon Stewart (disambiguation)